Trichosphaerocera is a genus of flies belonging to the family Lesser Dung flies.

Species
T. africana Papp, 1978

References

Sphaeroceridae
Diptera of Africa
Brachycera genera